Joseph Schlesser (18 May 1928 – 7 July 1968) was a French Formula One and sports car racing driver.  He participated in three World Championship Grands Prix, including the 1968 French Grand Prix in which he was killed. He scored no championship points. He was the uncle of Jean-Louis Schlesser who himself became a Formula One driver in the 1980s.

Early career
Schlesser began his motor sport career in 1952, when he rallied a Panhard before, in 1954, trying the then popular French class of racing known as Monomill. His career was then interrupted for three years whilst he was working in Mozambique but he returned to Europe in 1957 when he finished second in the Rome–Liège–Rome Rally in a Mercedes. He then raced a Ferrari 250 GT but without much success until 1960 when he finished second in class at the Nürburgring 1000 km and second overall at Rouen. He also raced a Cooper in Formula Two in 1960 but only achieved a sixth place at Syracuse. In 1961 his season was cut short by an accident at Le Mans but he returned in 1962 with a Formula Junior Brabham.

In 1964 Schlesser moved to the new one-litre Formula Two and became a highly regarded competitor in European Formula Two in the pre-European Formula Two Championship era. In 1966 he joined the works Matra Formula Two team and continued with the same team as Ford France in 1967. In 1968 he joined his close friend Guy Ligier to race McLarens.

Jo Schlesser also raced in NASCAR, finishing 13th in the 1964 Daytona 500 as a teammate to Ned Jarrett.

Formula Two 

Schlesser participated in the 1966 German Grand Prix at the Nürburgring with a Formula Two (F2) specification Matra MS5-BRM 1.0 litre and again in 1967 at the same venue with an F2 Matra MS5-Cosworth 1.6 litre. In 1966, he finished 10th in the overall classification and third in the Formula Two classification. In 1967, he was forced to retire with a clutch problem after two laps.

Formula One and Death 

An opportunity for a Formula One seat came for Schlesser in the 1968 with Honda. The Honda team had completed an experimental air-cooled Formula One car (the RA302) which had been tested by their works driver John Surtees. Surtees pronounced it as not ready for racing, and a potential deathtrap. Undaunted, and with the financial help of Honda France, Honda entered it for the French Grand Prix at Rouen. Being the local hero, Schlesser was hired to drive it.
After two laps, the car slid wide at the Six Frères corner and crashed sideways into a bank. The magnesium-bodied Honda and 58 laps' worth of fuel ignited instantly, leaving Schlesser no chance of survival. As a result, Honda withdrew from Formula One at the end of the 1968 season after Surtees had again refused to drive the car in the Italian Grand Prix.

Legacy 

Guy Ligier, a close friend, former teammate and business partner, established his company Ligier Cars shortly after Schlesser's death, in fulfillment of the dream that they had shared, to build a "good car".
Ligier cars would receive type designators beginning with "JS" as a tribute to Schlesser. This tradition is being continued by Onroak, the current owner of Ligier Cars. Italian company Dallara would later adopt this style of nomenclature for their 2012 IndyCar entry by naming it after the new car's test driver Dan Wheldon, who had died in the final race of the new car's predecessor.

His nephew, Jean-Louis Schlesser, would also became a successful racing driver. He started in one Formula One Grand Prix, won the World Sportscar Championship and the Paris–Dakar Rally twice (1999 and 2000).

Racing record

24 Hours of Le Mans results

NASCAR
(key) (Bold – Pole position awarded by qualifying time. Italics – Pole position earned by points standings or practice time. * – Most laps led.)

Grand National Series

Daytona 500

Complete Formula One World Championship results
(key)

Non-championship Formula One results
(key)

Complete European Formula Two Championship results
(key)

External links
 Jo Schlesser's accident (in Italian)

References

1928 births
1968 deaths
French racing drivers
French Formula One drivers
Matra Formula One drivers
Honda Formula One drivers
European Formula Two Championship drivers
24 Hours of Le Mans drivers
12 Hours of Reims drivers
World Sportscar Championship drivers
Racing drivers who died while racing
Sport deaths in France
Filmed deaths in motorsport